Tall Man  may refer to:

 Tall Man (album), a 1979 country album
 Tall Man (Phantasm), a fictional character
 Tall Man (Trilby's Notes), a fictional character
 Tall Man lettering, using upper case lettering in drug names to avoid medication errors
 Tall man, a video installation by artist Vernon Ah Kee

See also

 The Tall Man (disambiguation)